Thief Hollow is a valley in McDonald County in the U.S. state of Missouri.

The rustlers that were known to frequent the valley inspired the name 'Thief Hollow'.

References

Valleys of McDonald County, Missouri
Valleys of Missouri